The 2010 1000 km of Hungaroring was the fourth round of the 2010 Le Mans Series season. It took place at the Hungaroring, Hungary on 22 August 2010. It was the first time a Le Mans Series event took place at the Hungarian track.

The race was also the first time an LMP2 class car has taken first, both in qualifying and the race. The No. 42 Strakka Racing HPD ARX-01C achieved such feat, with LMP2 cars running comparatively in lap times in the practice sessions, qualifying, and the race, sweeping the top six positions in the race overall, while most of the LMP1 cars suffered from reliability issues and/or driver errors throughout the day-to-night race; the best finisher was the No. 5 Beechdean Mansell Ginetta-Zytek.

Qualifying
For the first time in history, an LMP2 car took overall pole in a Le Mans Series event. Strakka Racing were the team that achieved such feat, qualifying 0.4 seconds ahead of the quickest LMP1 car, the No. 13 Rebellion Lola. The No. 49 Applewood Seven took their consecutive FLM pole, while the No. 50 Larbre Compétition took the GT1 pole being the one of only two cars in the class that ran in qualifying, and the No. 96 AF Corse took its consecutive GT2 pole.

Qualifying result
Pole position winners in each class are marked in bold.

Race
The race was scheduled to run for 229 laps; however, the six-hour time limit went in force; the winning No. 42 Strakka HPD ran 206 laps at the end of the race.

Race result
Class winners in bold.  Cars failing to complete 70% of winner's distance marked as Not Classified (NC).

References

Hungaroring
1000 km